Konstantin Evgenievich Kinchev (Panfilov) (born December 25, 1958) is a Russian rock singer, musician, frontman and the main songwriter for the Russian rock/hard rock band Alisa.

Biography 
Born Konstantin Evgenievich Panfilov in Moscow, Soviet Union, he took his grandfather's surname for his stage name Kostya Kinchev. When Kinchev was a 15-year-old, he heard heavy metal band Black Sabbath for the first time. After that he decided to collect musical albums of hard rock bands of that time. In the mid 1970s, before joining Alisa he played in some local Moscow-based bands. In 1984 Kinchev made the decision to leave Moscow and move to Leningrad, where he was offered to become Alisa's vocalist.

The band's lineup was finally completed in December 1984, when new vocalist Kostya Kinchev and guitarist Petr Samoylov joined. Their debut album Energia was released by state publishing monopoly Melodiya and sold more than a million copies.  
 
In 1987, the newspaper Smena accused Alisa's leader Kinchev of Nazi propaganda and worshipping Hitler. Kinchev filed a suit for calumny and moral loss compensation. After the year-long court process the magazine published a refutation. Alisa's next album was titled Article 206 part 2, a chapter ("Hooliganism") of the Soviet Union Procedural Code, alluding to this process.

Kinchev was baptised in 1992 after a series of concerts in Jerusalem, and since then Christianity has been the main influence on his alignment and his lyrics. Since the late 1990s his lyrics mainly dealt with Christianity, Russian patriotism, and Slavic unity. Kinchev has good relations with the priests of the Russian Orthodox Church. Kinchev's fairly conservative religious-patriotic shift was viewed unfavourably by some old fans that liked Alisa for their original "rock" message. Still others are put off by his antisemitism – among other things, he has referred to the Protocols of the Elders of Zion as a credible source.

References

1958 births
Living people
Russian Orthodox Christians from Russia
Russian-language poets
Russian rock singers
Russian male singer-songwriters
Soviet songwriters
Soviet male singers
20th-century Russian male singers
20th-century Russian singers